is a 1966 Japanese B movie directed by Seijun Suzuki for the Nikkatsu Corporation. It is Suzuki's third adaptation of a Toko Kon novel, following The Bastard and Stories of Bastards: Born Under a Bad Star.

Cast
Yumiko Nogawa as Tsuyuko Takeda
Ruriko Ito as Senko Takeda
Chikako Miyagi as Kiku Takeda
Michio Hino as Yukichi Takeda
Kayo Matsuo as Yukie
Kōji Wada : Akira Sakata

References

External links
 Japan Foundation notes at Cinefiles
 
 
 Carmen from Kawachi  at the Japanese Movie Database

1966 films
1966 drama films
Films based on Japanese novels
Films directed by Seijun Suzuki
1960s Japanese-language films
Lesbian-related films
Nikkatsu films
LGBT-related drama films
1966 LGBT-related films
1960s Japanese films